The Albatros L 78 was a revamp of the Albatros L 76. The reconnaissance aircraft was created in 1928. It was a two-seater biplane with two 7.9 caliber machine guns with one being on the turret. Its engine was a BMW VI. 

The L78 was tested at the German flight testing centre at Rechlin–Lärz Airfield in 1928.  Six or seven L 78s were used by the German secret air force training school at Lipetsk, Russia from 1929 until the school was closed in 1933, with the survivors returning to Germany. At least four were wrecked in crashes while at Lipetsk. Eventually, it had two modifications: A reconnaissance bomber, and the other having a passenger cabin with windows and a door.  In total, 14 of these aircraft were made.

References

Reconnaissance aircraft
1928 establishments
Albatros aircraft
Biplanes